Voyevodin or Voevodin is a Russian masculine surname, its feminine counterpart is Voyevodina or Voevodina. It may refer to
Aleksey Voyevodin (born 1970), Russian race walker
Alexander Voevodin (born 1949), Soviet-born biomedical scientist and educator
Rihana Oksana Gorbatenko Voevodina (born 1992), former wife of the Muhammad V of Kelantan, the former Yang di-Pertuan Agong of Malaysia
Pyotr Voevodin (1884–1964), Russian revolutionary, Soviet politician and film industry figure
Vladimir Voevodin (born 1962) is a computer scientist, professor at Lomonosov Moscow State University
Yuliya Voyevodina (born 1971), Russian race walker, wife of Aleksey Voyevodin

Russian-language surnames